Fremont station (also known as Fremont–Centerville station) is a train station located in the Centerville area of Fremont, California, United States. The station is served by Amtrak Capitol Corridor commuter rail/intercity rail service and the Altamont Corridor Express (ACE) commuter rail service.

The station has two platforms serving the two tracks of the Niles Subdivision. Most trains use the longer west platform (Platform 1).

History

Centerville's first Southern Pacific Railroad station was nothing more than a boxcar, functioning in that capacity from May 1909 to September 1910.  In that month the current wooden structure was opened.  It was one of sixty Type 23 stations built by Southern Pacific, and its cost was under $5,000 USD (equivalent to $ in ).  The station was a busy one during its early years, handling both freight and passenger traffic, including two to three daily milk trains.  By the mid-1920s, automobile traffic began to grow, and the milk trains were discontinued.  Passenger service ended on March 29, 1940.  The Railway Express Agency continued shipping to and from the station until 1958.  The station was completely closed on September 30, 1961.

The station changed hands many times in the following decades, becoming a furniture store, a spice store, a toy store, and an electronics store at different times.  Its condition deteriorated, however, and in 1991 it was abandoned. The Depot Diner, located at the west end of the depot, contains the historic "creamery" counter and chairs from Cloverdale Creamery (which closed in 2000). Fremont Flowers (which in 1956 opened in the depot) moved the original diner chairs and counter to the depot. The owner of the flower shop also owns the Depot Diner.

On June 4, 1993, Amtrak restored service to the depot.  In December of that year, it was acquired by the city.

On March 15, 1995, the station was moved from the south side of the tracks to the north side of the tracks; it was also rotated 180 degrees to allow for more parking space.  The station was restored between October 1998 and June 12, 1999.  The cost of these projects was over $900,000.  The station now appears as it did in 1910.  On November 23, 2002, a platform and shelter was built on the south side of the tracks.  It is called the Bill Ball Plaza, named after a former mayor of Fremont. Funding was allocated via SB 1 to extend the station platform.

A 2016-released Vision Plan called for Capitol Corridor trains to be rerouted over the Coast Subdivision, which is used by less freight service. Fremont station would be replaced by a new station on the border of Fremont and Newark on the Coast Subdivision.

References

External links

Fremont, CA – ACE
Fremont, CA – USA Rail Guide (TrainWeb)

Amtrak stations in Alameda County, California
Altamont Corridor Express stations in Alameda County, California
Buildings and structures in Fremont, California
Amtrak Thruway Motorcoach stations in Alameda County, California
Bus stations in Alameda County, California
Former Southern Pacific Railroad stations in California
Railway stations in the United States opened in 1910
Railway stations in the United States opened in 1993
Railway stations closed in 1940